William Keith, 4th Earl Marischal (died 7 October 1581) was a Scottish nobleman and politician.

Family background and career

William Keith was the son of Robert Keith, Master of Marischal and Lady Elizabeth Douglas, daughter of John Douglas, 2nd Earl of Morton. He succeeded his grandfather, William Keith, 3rd Earl Marischal. He was one of the earls who accompanied James V to France for his marriage to Madeleine of Valois, daughter of King Francis I of France. The wedding took place on 1 January 1537 at Notre Dame Cathedral in Paris and was followed by days of Jousting at the Louvre.

He fought at the Battle of Pinkie in 1547, in which the Scots were defeated by the English forces led by Edward Seymour, 1st Duke of Somerset in a bloody battle that was part of the War of the Rough Wooing. Keith was said to have been in favour of the proposed marriage between the infant Mary, Queen of Scots, and Prince Edward of England, son of King Henry VIII. He held the Office of Extraordinary Lord of Session in 1541, 1561, and lastly in 1573.
In 1561, he was a member of Queen Mary's Privy Council, and while refraining from extreme partisanship, he was an adherent of the Reformation. Later, the Earl Marischal retired with his great fortune to a secluded life at Dunnottar Castle becoming known locally as "William of the Tower." The Earl died on 7 October 1581.

Marriage and issue

He married Margaret Keith.  William and Margaret had thirteen children:
 William Keith, Master of Marischal (died 1580). 
 Robert Keith, 1st Lord Altrie (died 1596).
 John Keith, probable Rector of Duffas.
 Agnes Keith, Countess of Moray (or Annas), m. 1st to the Regent Moray, 2nd. to Colin Campbell, 6th Earl of Argyll. She died 16 July 1588 at Edinburgh.
 Alexander Keith 
 Alison, m. to Alexander Abernethy, 6th Lord Saltoun (died 1587).
 Mary, m. to Sir John Campbell of Calder (dispensation for consanguinity).
 Beatrice, m. to Sir John Allardice of Allardice. She died 19 May 1596.
 Joneta, m. to James Crichton of Frendraught.
 Margaret, m. to John Kennedy of Blairquhan.
 Elizabeth, m. to Sir Alexander Irvine of Drum. Their son Robert Irvine was Master of Household to George, Earl Marischal, during his diplomatic mission to Denmark.
 Isobel, m. Alexander Strachan of Thornton. She died August 1595.
 Barbara, promised in m., failing her sister Isobel, to Alexander Strachan; m. Alexander Forbes of Pitsligo.

Keith's chief residence was Dunnottar Castle in Aberdeenshire.

When he died on 7 October 1581, he was succeeded by his grandson, George Keith, son of William, Master of Marischal; George became the 5th Earl Marischal.

Arms

References

Year of birth unknown
1581 deaths
Earls Marischal
Members of the Privy Council of Scotland
16th-century Scottish people
Scottish soldiers
Privy Council of Mary, Queen of Scots
Extraordinary Lords of Session